Programmed cell death protein 5 is a protein, originally identified as an apoptosis-accelerating protein, that in humans is encoded by the PDCD5 gene.

This gene encodes a protein expressed in tumor cells during apoptosis independent of the apoptosis-inducing stimuli. Prior to apoptosis induction, this gene product is distributed in both the nucleus and cytoplasm.

Once apoptosis is induced, the level of this protein increases and by relocation from the cytoplasm, it accumulates in the nucleus. Although its exact function is not defined, this protein is thought to play an early and universal role in apoptosis.

References

Further reading